Fabian Bernhard Schmitt (born 15 June 1992) is a German Greco-Roman wrestler. He won one of the bronze medals in the 55 kg event at the 2019 European Wrestling Championships held in Bucharest, Romania.

Career 

He competed in the 55 kg event at the 2013 European Wrestling Championships held in Tbilisi, Georgia.

In 2019, he competed in the 55 kg event at the World Wrestling Championships held in Nur-Sultan, Kazakhstan where he was eliminated in his first match by Max Nowry of the United States. In 2020, he competed in the 55 kg event at the 2020 European Wrestling Championships held in Rome, Italy where he was eliminated in his first match by Giovanni Freni of Italy.

In January 2021, he won the bronze medal in the 55 kg event at the Grand Prix Zagreb Open held in Zagreb, Croatia. In April 2021, he lost his bronze medal match in the 55 kg event at the European Wrestling Championships in Warsaw, Poland. A year later, he competed in the 55 kg event at the 2022 European Wrestling Championships in Budapest, Hungary where he was eliminated in his first match.

Achievements

References

External links 
 

Living people
1992 births
Place of birth missing (living people)
German male sport wrestlers
European Wrestling Championships medalists
20th-century German people
21st-century German people